Renaud Jay (born 12 August 1991) is a French cross-country skier.

Cross-country skiing results
All results are sourced from the International Ski Federation (FIS).

Olympic Games

World Championships
1 medal – (1 bronze)

World Cup

Season standings

Individual podiums

 1 podium – (1 )

Team podiums
 2 victories – (2 ) 
 3 podiums – (3 )

References

External links

1991 births
Cross-country skiers at the 2014 Winter Olympics
Cross-country skiers at the 2022 Winter Olympics
Living people
Olympic cross-country skiers of France
French male cross-country skiers
Université Savoie-Mont Blanc alumni
FIS Nordic World Ski Championships medalists in cross-country skiing